Faune was a French naval Abeille-class brig-corvette launched in 1804 to a design by François Pestel in 1803. She participated in the capture of HMS Blanche in July 1805. The Royal Navy captured Faune in August 1805. She was taken into service as HMS Fawn, but the last record of her dates to 1806. In 1807 the Royal Navy launched a new .

Career
On 19 July 1805 Faune was part of a squadron of four vessels that captured Blanche off Puerto Rico, three days after they had left Martinique. The other three were the 40-gun French frigate Topaze, the 22-gun corvette Department des Landes, and the 18-gun Torche. Faune was under the command of Lieutenant Charles Brunet.

About one month later, Faune, still under the command of enseigne de vaisseau Brunet, was carrying dispatches from Fort-de-France to Saint-Nazaire via Saint-Martin-de-Ré. When she was southwest of Ouessant, on 15 August, she had the misfortune to encounter . The 74-gun, third rate  was in the Channel Fleet when she saw a sail to eastward and three sail to westward. Goliath sailed east and joined the chase, helping Camilla to capture Faune. Faune was armed with 16 guns and had on board 98 men. She also had on board as prisoners 22 men from Blanche.

After Goliath helped Camilla capture Faune, Goliath set off in chase of the other three French vessels. Raisonnable joined Goliath and they were able to capture Torche, but Topaze and Department-des-Landes escaped. The Royal Navy later took Torche into service as HMS Torch

Captain Robert Barton of Goliath sent Faune into Portsmouth with Camilla. Barton reported that Faune was a new ship, on her first voyage, from Martinique, extremely fast, and  would make a good addition to the Royal Navy.

The Royal Navy took Faun into service as HMS Fawn. However, after 1806 there are no records of her.

Notes, citations, and references
Notes

Citations

References
 
Fonds Marine. Campagnes (opérations; divisions et stations navales; missions diverses). Inventaire de la sous-série Marine BB4. Tome premier: BB210 à 482 (1805-18826) 
  
Walters, Samuel (1949) Memoirs of an Officer in Nelson's Navy. (Liverpool University Press). 
 
Winfield, Rif & Stephen S Roberts (2015) French Warships in the Age of Sail 1786 - 1861: Design Construction, Careers and Fates. (Seaforth Publishing). 

1804 ships
Ships built in France
Abeille-class brigs
Brigs of the French Navy
Captured ships
Brigs of the Royal Navy